The Goodyear Polyglas tire was a bias-belted tire announced in 1967 by Goodyear. "Polyglas" was a registered trademark. The tire combined the characteristics of bias-ply and radial-ply tires. They had a wider tread than most other tires on the market at the time and used belts made of fiberglass.

Design
Conventional tires up to that time featured a bias or cross ply construction with body cords extending diagonally from bead to bead. The Polyglas tires had bias construction that added stabilizing circumference belts directly beneath the tread. Goodyear promoted the design as having less tread "squirm" as the tire rolls on the road surface because of the additional fiberglass belts. This feature increased the mileage and improved road holding performance. The tires featured a wide footprint.

Application
The tires initially were an original equipment on late 1960s muscle cars such as the Pontiac GTO, Dodge Charger R/T, Ford Mustang Mach I, Chevrolet Camaro Z-28, and many others along with comparable tires from various competitors such as the Firestone Wide-Oval, Uniroyal's Tiger Paw, and BF Goodrich's Radial T/A. Goodyear and comparable bias-belted tires began appearing as standard or optional equipment on most 1969-model passenger cars and nearly all 1970 to 1974 models. 

The most common version of the Polyglas found on muscle cars of that era was the Polyglas GT, which was one of the first commercially available raised white lettered tires on the market. Other versions of the Polyglas lineup were offered as blackwall, redline, whitewall, and snow treaded tires. For driving in winter, Polyglass Pathfinder line of tires were available in special versions for the steering front and rear driving axles along with optional "Safety Spikes" (studs).

Advertising
The tires were marketed for their longer life as well as in situations where better tires are needed to compensate for the driver and difficult conditions.

Successors
The Polyglas tire and its competitors were soon replaced by steel belted radials as original equipment tires around 1975. Goodyear Polyglas tires are now manufactured for owners of period cars. Many of these tires feature the distinctive "redlines" that were popular on high performance cars at the time.

Notes 

Tires
Goodyear Tire and Rubber Company